John Robinson, Jr. (February 3, 1705 – May 11, 1766) was an American politician and landowner in the colony of Virginia. Robinson served as Speaker of the House of Burgesses from 1738 until his death, the longest tenure in the history of that office.

Early and family life

John Robinson was born to the former Catherine Beverley in Middlesex County and her planter husband John Robinson, both of the First Families of Virginia. His father would soon become one of the two members of the House of Burgesses representing Middlesex County, serving alongside his uncle Christopher Robinson. Robinson's father would ultimately serve on the Governor's Council (the upper house of the Virginia General Assembly, the House of Burgesses being the lower house) for 28 years, including a brief term as acting Governor until his unexpected death on August 24, 1749. Another uncle, also Bishop John Robinson was known for his loyalty to the Crown and diplomatic expertise.

Although documentation concerning this man's childhood is limited, he undoubtedly received a private education suitable to his class. He also studied at the College of William & Mary in Williamsburg instead of being sent to England to complete his education, as had his father and eldest brother, Christopher (1703-1738, who died unmarried at Oriel College of Oxford University). Hia brother William (1709-1792) moved to Spotsylvania County and married Agatha, the daughter of Henry Beverley; his brother Robert(b. 1711) became Captain of the East Indiaman and would be buried at Gravesend in England, and Henry (1718-1758) would marry Mary Waring. His youngest brother Beverley Robinson (1722-1792) would leave Virginia with a company of Virginia soldiers to defend the New York frontier, and married an heiress in that state, but would ultimately become a Loyalist during the American Revolution and moved to and died in Britain. The family also included sisters Mary Robinson (1707-1739) and Catherine Robinson Wagoner (1715-1776).

Robinson married three times, surviving his first two wives, but his only descendants are by his daughter Susan of his final marriage. His first wife was Mary Storey (or "Story"). His second wife was Lucy Moore, daughter of wealthy merchant and planter Augustine Moore and sister of his man's political ally Bernard Moore. Robinson's third wife and widow was Susanna Chiswell, daughter of Col. John Chiswell of Williamsburg (and who remarried to William Griffin in 1771). Their daughter Susan Robinson married Robert Nelson, who bought Malvern Hill plantation and was the brother of Virginia Governor Thomas Nelson.

Career

Like his father, uncle and others of his class, Robinson was a planter who produced tobacco for export to Europe using enslaved labor. He also continued the tradition of both sides of his family by serving part-time in the House of Burgesses, representing King and Queen County. He won re-election before every session for nearly three decades, until his death. During this long tenure, Robinson demonstrated mastery of the rules of parliamentary procedure.

Robinson also served as the colony's treasurer from 1738 until his death. When the previous treasurer, John Holloway, had resigned, the accounts were found in disorder, with  £1,850 in arrears, possibly from amounts not forwarded by county sheriffs, though Holloway had also commingled state and personal funds. After Robinson died, the burgesses discovered that he failed to burn redeemed notes but instead made personal loans exceeding 100,000 pounds from the treasury to his friends, and also failed to deposit funds received by local sheriffs into the Treasury.  The resulting scandal was a factor in Virginia politics for years. Robinson's estate was not settled until decades after the end of the American Revolution.

While John Robinson was speaker of the House, relations with England deteriorated after the French and Indian War, as British officials attempted to recoup costs. Following news of the Stamp Act in 1765, some burgesses proposed the Virginia Resolves against those fiscal measures. After Patrick Henry's speech favoring the resolution, Robinson shouted, "Treason!, Treason!"

Positions held in the Virginia Colony

Delegate, Virginia House of Burgesses (1728–1738)
Speaker of Virginia House of Burgesses (1738–1766)
Treasurer, Virginia Colony (1738–1766)

Death and legacy
Following Robinson's death at his main plantation on the night of May 10/11, possibly from an attack of kidney stones, his administrators found he had very large debts, as well as promissory notes from a number of fellow planters who were his allies in the House of Burgesses. A committee established to examine the treasury accounts found an arrearage of  £100,761. Robert Carter Nicholas, his successor as treasurer, criticized him by name in the Virginia Gazetter, and as a result of the ensuing scandal, the two offices were not combined again. Peyton Randolph succeeded him as Speaker, but chose not to administer Robinson's estate. Although three lawyers were appointed as the estate's administrators, Peter Randolph soon died, Peter Lyons chose not participate actively, and Robinson's former ally Edmund Pendleton performed most of the work trying to both repay creditors and limit the scandal tarring Robinson's former beneficiaries.

Notes

References

External links
Bio - a little information on John Robinson.

1705 births
1766 deaths
American planters
American slave owners
College of William & Mary alumni
People from King and Queen County, Virginia
People from Middlesex County, Virginia
Speakers of the Virginia House of Burgesses